Warmur is a locality in the local government area of the Shire of Buloke, Victoria, Australia. There is a rural CFA station in Warmur. The post office there opened as Warmur West State School on the 1 7 1905, renamed to Warmur West in 1907 and was closed in 1930.

References